Yannick de Wit (born 26 August 1986) is a Dutch footballer who plays as a midfielder for Tweede Klasse club Blauw-Wit Beursbengels.

Career
Born in Zaanstad, De Wit is a product of the Ajax youth system. He also played for FC Volendam, Go Ahead Eagles and FC Emmen. After leaving the latter, De Wit started playing amateur football for ASV De Dijk and later moved to HBOK. In June 2020, he joined seventh-tier Tweede Klasse club  Blauw-Wit Beursbengels.

References

External links
 Voetbal International profile 

1986 births
Living people
Dutch footballers
Association football midfielders
FC Volendam players
Go Ahead Eagles players
FC Emmen players
Eredivisie players
Eerste Divisie players
Footballers from Zaanstad
ASV De Dijk players